Kenneth L. Przybysz (born c. 1947) is an American politician.

Przybysz served two terms each in the Connecticut House of Representatives and the Connecticut Senate, a total of four terms and twelve years in the Connecticut Legislature, until losing a September 1994 Democratic Party primary for the Connecticut Senate to Edith Prague. After losing the primary, Przybysz ran in the general election as a candidate of A Connecticut Party. He later became a lobbyist.

References

1940s births
Living people
Democratic Party members of the Connecticut House of Representatives
Democratic Party Connecticut state senators
20th-century American politicians
American lobbyists
A Connecticut Party politicians